This is a list of hospitals in the five boroughs of New York City, sorted by hospital name, with addresses and brief descriptions of their formation and development. Hospital names were obtained from these sources.

Hospitals
 Manhattan: 
 The Bronx: 
 Brooklyn: 
 Queens: 
 Staten Island:

Closed hospitals
Includes former names of hospitals
 Manhattan: 
 The Bronx: 
 Brooklyn: 
 Queens: 
 Staten Island:

References

External links
 

 
New York City
New York City
Hospitals